James Hepburn may refer to:

 James Hepburn (bishop) (died 1524), Bishop of Moray
 James Hepburn, 4th Earl of Bothwell (c. 1534–1578), Scottish ruler, Duke of Orkney, the third husband of Mary, Queen of Scots
 Bonaventure Hepburn (James Hepburn, 1573–1621), Scottish orientalist
 James Hepburn Campbell (1820–1895), American politician and diplomat
 James Curtis Hepburn (1815–1911), American missionary
 James de Congalton Hepburn (1878–1955), Canadian MPP
 Jamie Hepburn (born 1979), Scottish politician
 James Hepburn (ornithologist) (1811–1869), English ornithologist
 Jock Hepburn (c. 1860–?), birth name James, Scottish footballer (Alloa Athletic and Scotland)
 James Hepburn (golfer) (1876–1945), golfer from Scotland